Maija Tīruma (born 28 November 1983) is a former Latvian luger who competed from 2000 to 2013.
She won two bronze medals in the mixed team relay event at the FIL World Luge Championships (2008, 2009). Tīruma also won a gold medal in the mixed team relay event at the 2008 FIL European Luge Championships in Cesana, Italy and finished seventh in the women's singles event at those same championships. Competing in three Winter Olympics, she earned her best finish of ninth in the women's singles event at Vancouver in 2010.

Since 2013, she is the head coach of the Bobsleigh, Luge and Skeleton Club of la Plagne in France. Her younger sister Elīza Cauce is also an Olympic luger.

References
 
 2002 luge women's singles results
 2006 luge women's singles results

External links

 
 
 

1983 births
Living people
Latvian female lugers
Olympic lugers of Latvia
Lugers at the 2002 Winter Olympics
Lugers at the 2006 Winter Olympics
Lugers at the 2010 Winter Olympics
Sportspeople from Riga